SGLT2 inhibitors, also called gliflozins or flozins, are a class of medications that modulate sodium-glucose transport proteins in the nephron (the functional units of the kidney), unlike SGLT1 inhibitors that perform a similar function in the intestinal mucosa. The foremost metabolic effect of this is to inhibit reabsorption of glucose in the kidney and therefore lower blood sugar. They act by inhibiting sodium-glucose transport protein 2 (SGLT2). SGLT2 inhibitors are used in the treatment of type II diabetes mellitus (T2DM). Apart from blood sugar control, gliflozins have been shown to provide significant cardiovascular benefit in patients with type II diabetes (T2DM). Several medications of this class have been approved or are currently under development. In studies on canagliflozin, a member of this class, the medication was found to enhance blood sugar control as well as reduce body weight and systolic and diastolic blood pressure.

Medical uses
The 2022 ADA standards of medical care in diabetes include SGLT2 inhibitors as a first line pharmacological therapy for type 2 diabetes (usually together with metformin), specifically in patients with chronic kidney disease, cardiovascular disease or heart failure.

A systematic review and network meta-analysis comparing SGLT-2 inhibitors, GLP-1 agonists, and DPP-4 inhibitors demonstrated that use of SGLT2 inhibitors was associated with a 20% reduction in death compared with placebo or no treatment. Another systematic review discussed the mechanisms by which SGLT-2 inhibitors improve cardio-renal function in patients with type 2 diabetes mellitus, emphasizing the impacts in improving neural tone.

Two reviews have concluded that SGLT2 inhibitors benefit patients with atherosclerotic major adverse cardiovascular events (MACE). One of those studies defined MACE as the composite of myocardial infarction, stroke, or cardiovascular death.

Adverse effects 
Genital infections seem to be the most common adverse effect of gliflozins. In clinical trials fungal infections, urinary tract infections and osmotic diuresis were higher in patients treated with gliflozins.

In May 2015, the FDA issued a warning that gliflozins can increase risk of diabetic ketoacidosis (DKA). By reducing glucose blood circulation, gliflozins cause less stimulation of endogenous insulin secretion or lower dose of exogenous insulin that results in diabetic ketoacidosis. They can specifically cause euglycemic DKA (euDKA, DKA where the blood sugar is not elevated) because of the renal tubular absorption of ketone bodies. A particularly high risk period for ketoacidosis is the perioperative period. SGLT2 inhibitors may need to be discontinued before surgery, and only recommended when someone is not unwell, is adequately hydrated and able to consume a regular diet.

In September 2015, the FDA issued a warning related to canagliflozin (Invokana) and canagliflozin/metformin (Invokamet) due to decreased bone mineral density and therefore increased risk of bone fractures. Using gliflozins in combination therapy with metformin can lower the risk of hypoglycemia compared to other T2DM such as sulfonylureas and insulin.

Increased risk of lower limb amputation is associated with canagliflozin but further data is needed to confirm this risk associated with different gliflozins. A European Medicines Agency review concluded that there is a potential increased risk of lower limb amputation (mostly affecting the toes) in people taking canagliflozin, dapagliflozin and empagliflozin.

In August 2018, the FDA issued a warning of an increased risk of Fournier gangrene in patients using SGLT2 inhibitors. The absolute risk is considered very low.

To lessen the risk of developing ketoacidosis (a serious condition in which the body produces high levels of blood acids called ketones) after surgery, the FDA has approved changes to the prescribing information for SGLT2 inhibitor diabetes medicines to recommend they be stopped temporarily before scheduled surgery. Canagliflozin, dapagliflozin, and empagliflozin should each be stopped at least three days before, and ertugliflozin should be stopped at least four days before scheduled surgery.

Symptoms of ketoacidosis include nausea, vomiting, abdominal pain, tiredness, and trouble breathing.

In the FDA Adverse Event Reporting System an increase was reported in events of acute kidney injury associated with SGLT2 inhibitors, though data from clinical trials actually showed a reduction in such events with SGLT-2 treatment.

Interactions 
Interactions are important for SGLT2 inhibitors because most T2DM patients are taking many other medications. Gliflozins appear to increase the diuretic effect of thiazides, loop diuretics and related diuretics and may increase the risk of dehydration and hypotension. It is important to adjust the dose of antidiabetics if the treatment is combination therapy to avoid hypoglycemia. For example, interactions with sulfonylureas have led to severe hypoglycemia presumably due to cytochrome P450.

A study has shown that it is safe to consume dapagliflozin along with pioglitazone, metformin, glimepiride, or sitagliptin and dose adjustment is unnecessary for either medication. It is unlikely that food intake has clinical meaningful impact on the efficacy of dapagliflozin, therefore it can be administered without regard to meals.

Members
These are the known members of the gliflozin class:
 Bexagliflozin was approved in the United States under the brand name Brenzavvy in January 2023.
 Canagliflozin was the first SGLT2 inhibitor to be approved for use in the United States. It was approved in March 2013, under the brand name Invokana and it was also marketed throughout the EU under the same name.
 Dapagliflozin is the first SGLT2 inhibitor approved anywhere in the world by the EU in 2012. It was approved for use in the United States under the brand name Farxiga by the Food and Drug Administration in January 2014. the first oral treatment in combination with insulin to treat type 1 diabetes mellitus in UK and EU.
 Empagliflozin, approved in the United States in August 2014, under the brand name Jardiance by Boehringer Ingelheim. Of the gliflozins, empagliflozin and tofogliflozin have the highest specificity for SGLT2 inhibition. This oral medicine for type 2 diabetes has been shown to reduce the risk of cardiovascular death.
 Ertugliflozin was approved in the United States under the brand name Steglatro in December 2017.
 Ipragliflozin, produced by the Japanese company Astellas Pharma Inc. under the brand name Suglat, approved in Japan January 2014.
 Luseogliflozin was approved in Japan March 2014 under the brand name Lusefi and was developed by Taisho Pharmaceutical.
 Remogliflozin etabonate was commercially launched first in India by Glenmark in May 2019. 
 Sergliflozin etabonate discontinued after Phase II trials.
 Sotagliflozin is a dual SGLT1/SGLT2 inhibitor in phase III trials under the brand name Zynquista. Developed by Lexicon pharmaceuticals. It was planned to be the first oral treatment in combination with insulin to treat type 1 diabetes mellitus. The Food and Drug Administration refused its approval for use in combination with insulin for the treatment of type 1 diabetes.
 Tofogliflozin was approved in Japan in March 2014, under the brand names Apleway and Deberza developed by Sanofi and Kowa Pharmaceutical.

Mechanism of action 

Sodium Glucose cotransporters (SGLTs) are proteins that occur primarily in the kidneys and play an important role in maintaining glucose balance in the blood. SGLT1 and SGLT2 are the two most known SGLTs of this family. SGLT2 is the major transport protein and promotes reabsorption from the glomerular filtration glucose back into circulation and is responsible for approximately 90% of the kidney's glucose reabsorption. SGLT2 is mainly expressed in the kidneys on the epithelial cells lining the first segment of the proximal convoluted tubule. By inhibiting SGLT2, gliflozins prevent the kidneys' reuptake of glucose from the glomerular filtrate and subsequently lower the glucose level in the blood and promote the excretion of glucose in the urine (glucosuria).

The mechanism of action on a cellular level is not well understood. Work is underway to define this mechanism as a prodiuretic with great promise. However, it has been shown that binding of different sugars to the glucose site affects the orientation of the aglycone in the access vestibule. So when the aglycone binds it affects the entire inhibitor. Together these mechanisms lead to a synergistic interaction. Therefore, variations in the structure of both the sugar and the aglycone are crucial for the pharmacophore of SGLT inhibitors.

Dapagliflozin is an example of an SGLT-2 inhibitor, it is a competitive, highly selective inhibitor of SGLT. It acts via selective and potent inhibition of SGLT-2, and its activity is based on each patient's underlying blood sugar control and kidney function. The results are decreased kidney reabsorption of glucose, glucosuria effect increases with higher level of glucose in the blood circulation. Therefore, dapagliflozin reduces the blood glucose concentration with a mechanism that is independent of insulin secretion and sensitivity, unlike many other antidiabetic medications. Functional pancreatic β-cells are not necessary for the activity of the medication so it is convenient for patients with diminished β-cell function.

Sodium and glucose are co-transported by the SGLT-2 protein into the tubular epithelial cells across the brush-border membrane of the proximal convoluted tubule. This happens because of the sodium gradient between the tubule and the cell and therefore provides a secondary active transport of glucose. Glucose is later reabsorbed by passive transfer of endothelial cells into the interstitial glucose transporter protein.

Ratios of activity between SGLT1 and SGLT2 may be helpful in defining expression.

Pharmacology 
The elimination half-life, bioavailability, protein binding, the blood concentration Cmax at time tmax, and other pharmacokinetic parameters of various medications of this class are present in table 2. These medications are excreted in the urine as inactive metabolites.

Cmax: Maximum serum concentration that drug achieves in body after the drug has been and administrated
tmax: Time to achieve maximum plasma concentration
t1/2: Biological half-life

In studies that were made on healthy people and people with type II diabetes mellitus, who were given dapagliflozin in either single ascending dose (SAD) or multiple ascending dose (MAD) showed results that confirmed a pharmacokinetic profile of the medication. With dose-dependent concentrations the half-life is about 12–13 hours, Tmax 1–2 hours and it is protein-bound, so the medication has a rapid absorption and minimal excretion by the kidney.

Dapagliflozin disposition is not evidently affected by BMI or body weight, therefore the pharmacokinetic findings are expected to be applicable to patients with a higher BMI. Dapagliflozin resulted in dose-dependent increases excretions in urinary glucose, up to 47g/d following single-dose administration, which can be expected from its mechanism of action, dapagliflozin.

In some long term clinical studies that have been made on dapagliflozin, dapagliflozin was associated with a decrease in body weight which was statistically superior compared to placebo or other active comparators. It is primarily associated with caloric rather than fluid loss.

In contrast with other anti-hyperglycemic diabetes medications, SGLT2 inhibitors enhance, rather than suppress, gluconeogenesis and ketogenesis. Because SGLT2 inhibitors activate sirtuin 1 (and thus PGC-1α and FGF21), they are more cardioprotective than the other medications used to treat diabetes.

Structure-activity relationship 
The structure-activity relationship (SAR) of gliflozins is not fully understood.

The most common gliflozins are dapagliflozin, empagliflozin and canagliflozin. The differences in the structures is relatively small. The general structure includes a glucose sugar with an aromatic group in the β-position at the anomeric carbon. In addition to the glucose sugar moiety and the β-isomeric aryl substituent the aryl group is composed of a diarylmethylene structure.

The synthesis of Gliflozins involves three general steps. The first one is the construction of the aryl substituent, the next one is the introduction of the aryl moiety onto the sugar or glucosylation of the aryl substituent and the last one the deprotection and modification of the arylated anomeric center of the sugar.

Phlorizin was the first type of gliflozin and it was non-selective against SGLT2/SGLT1. It is a natural O-aryl glycoside composed of a d-glucose and an aromatic ketone. However Phlorizin is very unstable, it is rapidly degraded by glucosidases in the small intestines, so it can not be used as an oral administration medication to treat diabetes. Structural modifications have been made to overcome this instability problem. The most efficient way was to conjugate aryl moiety with glucose moiety since C-glucosides are more stable in the small intestines than O-glucoside derivatives (C-C bond instead of C-O-C bond).

In the sugar analogues of dapagliflozin, the β-C series are more active than α-C series so it is critical that the β-configuration is at C-1 for the inhibitory activity. Both dapagliflozin and empagliflozin contain a chlorine (Cl) atom in their chemical structure. Cl is a halogen and it has a high electronegativity. This electronegativity withdraws electrons off the bonds and therefore it reduces the metabolism. The Cl atom also reduces the IC50 value of the medication so the medication has better activity. The carbon-fluorine bond (C-F) has also has a veryl low electron density.

For example, in the chemical structure of canagliflozin a fluorine atom is connected to an aromatic ring then the compound is more stable and the metabolism of the compound is reduced. 
Empagliflozin contains a tetrahydrofuran ring but not canagliflozin nor dapagliflozin.

In the development of gliflozins the distal ring contains a thiophene ring instead of an aromatic ring. However the final chemical structures of the marketing gliflozins does not contain this thiophene ring.

Alternative pharmacological actions 
SGLT2 inhibitors increase circulating ketone body concentrations. The cardioprotective effects of SGLT2 inhibitors have been attributed to the elevated ketone levels.

Gliflozins have been posited to exhibit protective effects on the heart, liver, kidneys, anti‐hyperlipidemic, anti‐atherosclerotic, anti‐obesity, anti‐neoplastic effects in in vitro, pre‐clinical, and clinical studies. Pleiotropic effects of this class have been attributed to a variety of its pharmacodynamic actions such as natriuresis, hemoconcentration, deactivation of renin-angiotensin-aldosterone system, ketone body formation, alterations in energy homeostasis, glycosuria, lipolysis, anti‐inflammatory, and antioxidative actions.

History

Phlorizin is a molecule with SGLT inhibiting properties, and served an important role in the development of the gliflozin class of medications.

References

External links
 
 
 
 
 
 

 
Anti-diabetic drugs

ca:Gliflozina